

The DAR 1 Peperuda (butterfly) was a 1920s Bulgarian two-seat touring or trainer biplane, designed by Hermann Winter and built by the DAR – Drjavna Aeroplane Rаbotilnitsa – State Aircraft Workshops.

Design and development
The aircraft was a conventional two-seat single-bay biplane with a fixed tailskid landing gear, powered by a 60 hp (45 kW) Walter NZ radial engine. Further development resulted in the DAR 1A, which was powered by an 85 hp Walter Vega engine, eight DAR 1As being produced.

After the maiden flight and successful flight tests the DAR 1 was put into production in 1926. Production DAR 1A aircraft were delivered from 1928.

Operational history
The twelve DAR 1 and eight DAR 1A aircraft were used by the Bulgarian Air Force at the Kazanlak Air School, for primary training and the Yato fighter squadron for continuation training, from 1926 to the early 1940s. Some DAR 1A aircraft were also used by the Civil Air Service as glider tugs.

Variants
DAR 1
Initial production variant with a 60hp (45kW) Walter NZ 60 radial engine, 12 built.
DAR 1A
Variant powered by an 85hp (63kW) Walter Vega engine, eight built plus some upgraded from DAR 1s.

Operators

 Bulgarian Air Force
Kazanlak Air School
Yato Fighter Squadron
Bulgarian Civil Air Service

Specifications (DAR 1)

See also

References

Bibliography

Insignia Issue 8 March/April 1998 pp. 132–135
Air Power of the Kingdom of Bulgaria Part III

External links

 DAR DAR-1 Peperuda

1920s Bulgarian military trainer aircraft
DAR 01
Single-engined tractor aircraft
Biplanes